The 1954 Illinois State Normal Redbirds football team represented Illinois State Normal University—now known as Illinois State University—as a member of the Interstate Intercollegiate Athletic Conference (IIAC) during the 1954 college football season. Led by tenth-year head coach Edwin Struck, the Redbirds compiled an overall record of 5–3–1 with a mark of 3–2–1 in conference play, placing fourth in the IIAC. Illinois State Normal played home games at McCormick Field in Normal, Illinois.

Schedule

References

Illinois State Normal
Illinois State Redbirds football seasons
Illinois State Normal Redbirds football